Apu Nahasapeemapetilon is a recurring character in the American animated television series The Simpsons. He is an Indian immigrant proprietor who runs the Kwik-E-Mart, a popular convenience store in Springfield, and is known for his catchphrase, "Thank you, come again". He was formerly voiced by Hank Azaria and first appeared in the episode "The Telltale Head". He was named in honor of the title character of The Apu Trilogy by Satyajit Ray. 

A 2017 documentary, The Problem with Apu, wrote by and starring comedian Hari Kondabolu, criticized the character as a South Asian stereotype. In January 2020, Azaria reacted to this by announcing that he and the production crew of the series agreed for him to step down as the voice of Apu. , the final time that Azaria voiced Apu was in the season 29 premiere "The Serfsons" in 2017; since then, Apu has appeared as a background character.

Role in The Simpsons

Biography
In the episode "Homer and Apu", Apu says he is from Rahmatpur, West Bengal. Apu is a naturalized U.S. citizen, and he holds a Ph.D. in computer science. He graduated first in his class of seven million at 'Caltech' – Calcutta Technical Institute – going on to earn his doctorate at the Springfield Heights Institute of Technology (S.H.I.T.).

Apu began working at the Kwik-E-Mart during graduate school to pay off his student loan; he stayed afterwards as he enjoyed his job and the friends he had made. He remained an illegal immigrant until Mayor Quimby proposed a municipal law to expel all undocumented aliens. Apu responded by purchasing a forged birth certificate from the Springfield Mafia that listed his parents as American citizens Herb and Judy Nahasapeemapetilon from Green Bay, Wisconsin. When, however, he realized he was forsaking his origins, he abandoned this plan and instead successfully managed to pass his citizenship test with help from Lisa and Homer Simpson. Thus, he refers to himself as a "semi-legal alien".

In 1985, Apu was a member of the barbershop quartet The Be Sharps, along with Homer Simpson, Barney Gumble, and Principal Seymour Skinner. Upon the advice of the band manager, Nigel, Apu took the stage name "Apu de Beaumarchais" (a reference to Pierre Beaumarchais, author of The Barber of Seville).  Apu is a dietary vegan, as revealed in the season 7 episode "Lisa the Vegetarian".

Family
In the episode "The Two Mrs. Nahasapeemapetilons", Apu enjoys a brief period as Springfield's leading ladies' man after being spontaneously drawn into a bachelor auction. He spends the days following the auction on a whirlwind of dates, which suddenly end when his mother announces his arranged marriage to a woman named Manjula, whom he had not seen since childhood. Apu tries to get out of the arrangement at first, with Marge Simpson pretending to be his wife, until Apu's mother finds her with Homer. However, he is won over when he meets Manjula at the wedding, and the two decide to give the marriage a try, with Manjula noting nonchalantly that they can always get a divorce. Later, the two actually fall in love.

In the episode "Eight Misbehavin', Manjula receives too many doses of fertility drugs, leading to her giving birth to octuplets: Anoop, Uma, Nabendu, Poonam, Priya, Sandeep, Sashi, and Gheet. This causes difficulties for the family but finally they decide to get on with their life. During the episode "Bart-Mangled Banner", when the town changes its name to Libertyville to be patriotic after it is claimed Springfield hates America, Apu temporarily changes his children's names to Lincoln, Freedom, Condoleezza, Coke, Pepsi, Manifest Destiny, Apple Pie, and Superman.

Apu and Manjula have a mostly happy marriage, despite understandable marital problems caused by Apu's workaholic nature and long hours, and the strain of caring for eight children. A further strain came up when Apu was unfaithful to Manjula, causing him to briefly move out and even making him contemplate suicide. He and his family are devout Hindus, and he particularly venerates Ganesha.

Sanjay (voiced by Harry Shearer), Apu's brother, helps run the Kwik-E-Mart. Sanjay has a daughter named Pahasatira, and a son named Jamshed, all of whom share the Nahasapeemapetilon surname. Apu has another younger brother, who is only mentioned in "The Two Mrs. Nahasapeemapetilons", where Apu was shown on a chart as the oldest of three. Apu also has a cousin living in India named Kavi, also voiced by Azaria, who helped Homer while he was in India. Kavi works for several American companies taking service calls using General American, cowboy, and Jamaican accents.

Other appearances
Apu is a playable character in The Simpsons: Hit & Run video game. His quest in the game is to redeem himself for unknowingly selling the tainted Buzz Cola that has made the residents of Springfield insane.
Apu also makes an appearance in The Simpsons: Road Rage as a passenger and unlockable playable character. 
He also is a character players acquire fairly early on in the open-ended online game The Simpsons: Tapped Out.

Character

Apu first appeared in the season one episode "The Telltale Head". Al Jean and Mike Reiss claim that while creating the character, the writers decided they would not make him ethnic, as they felt it would be too offensive and stereotypical and did not want to offend viewers, but that the concept stayed because Hank Azaria's reading of the line "Hello, Mr. Homer" received a huge laugh from the writers. Azaria, however, has disputed this account, claiming instead that the writers asked him to create a stereotypical Indian accent for the character. Azaria has said that he based Apu's voice on Indian convenience store workers in Los Angeles with whom he had interacted when he first moved to the area. He also loosely based it on Peter Sellers' character Hrundi V. Bakshi from the film The Party, who Azaria thinks has a similar personality to Apu.

Apu's first name is an homage to the main character in The Apu Trilogy directed by Satyajit Ray. His surname is Nahasapeemapetilon, and it was first used in the episode "A Streetcar Named Marge". It is a morphophonological blend of the name "Pahasadee Napetilon", the full name of a schoolmate of Simpsons writer Jeff Martin.

In the ninth season of the show, Apu marries Manjula in the episode "The Two Mrs. Nahasapeemapetilons". Rich Appel first constructed the idea for Apu's marriage. Andrea Martin provided the voice of Apu's mother in the episode, recording her part in New York. She wanted to get the voice perfect, so in between takes she listened to tapes of Azaria reading lines for Apu, to make sure her voice could realistically be Apu's mother's.

Reception

Popularity
Apu is one of the most prominent South Asian characters on primetime television in the United States. Hank Azaria has won three Primetime Emmy Awards for Outstanding Voice-Over Performance, winning in 1998 for his performance as Apu, again in 2001 for "Worst Episode Ever", and a third time in 2003 for "Moe Baby Blues" for voicing several characters, including Apu.

Apu's image has been widely licensed, on items ranging from board games to auto air fresheners. In July 2007, convenience store chain 7-Eleven converted 11 of its stores in the United States and one in Canada into Kwik-E-Marts to celebrate the release of The Simpsons Movie.

Accusations of racial stereotyping
Apu's portrayal has been accused by some of being a racist caricature of Indians and South Asians in general and was criticized of the bias along racial/ethnic lines, "Brownvoice", similar to "Blackface". During the 2007 7-Eleven promotion, some members of the Indian-American community voiced concerns that Apu is a caricature that plays on too many negative stereotypes. Despite this, 7-Eleven reported that many of its Indian employees reacted positively to the idea, but noted that it was "not a 100 percent endorsement".

According to Hari Kondabolu, in a Totally Biased with W. Kamau Bell web-exclusive segment, there is a negative reaction to Apu in the Indian-American community, as well as the greater Desi community. Pakistani-American comedian and actor Kumail Nanjiani has also criticized the character and has related that early in his career, he was asked to do the "Apu accent" as a stereotypical version of the "Indian accent". In a 2007 interview, Azaria acknowledged some of this criticism when he recalled a conversation with the writers of the show during the inception of the character: "Right away they were like 'Can you do an Indian accent and how offensive can you make it?' basically. I was like, 'It's not tremendously accurate. It's a little, uh, stereotype,' and they were like, 'Eh, that's all right. In a 2013 interview with The Huffington Post, Azaria said it should not be expected that the character's accent would "suddenly change now" or that the character would be written out, saying, "I'd be surprised if [the show's writers] write him any less frequently because he's offensive."

In 2016, Kondabolu announced his intention to produce a documentary about "how this controversial caricature was created, burrowed its way into the hearts and minds of Americans and continues to exist – intact – twenty-six years later". In 2017, Kondabolu released the hour-long documentary The Problem with Apu; in the film, Kondabolu interviews other actors and comics of South Asian heritage about the impact that the character of Apu has had on their lives and the perception of South Asians in American culture.

In April 2018, The Simpsons reacted to the controversy surrounding Apu in the episode "No Good Read Goes Unpunished". Marge introduces Lisa to her favorite childhood book, but is shocked by its racist stereotypes and attempts to rewrite it to suit modern sensitivities. Lisa is bored by this revised version, and Marge asks what she should do; Lisa replies "It's hard to say. Something that started decades ago and was applauded and inoffensive is now politically incorrect. What can you do?" She then looks at a picture of Apu with "Don't have a cow, man" written on it, and the two characters say that the issue will be dealt with later, if at all. Kondabolu said that he was saddened by the show's dismissive take on the controversy. Mike Reiss, The Simpsons''' longtime writer and producer, acknowledged the problem, and pointed out that Apu had not had a line in the show for the last three years.

During an appearance that same month on The Late Show with Stephen Colbert, Azaria said that he would be "perfectly willing to step aside" from the role of voicing Apu, saying that he was increasingly worried about the character causing harm by reinforcing stereotypes and that "the most important thing is to listen to Indian people and their experience with it ... I really want to see Indian, South Asian writers in the writers' room, genuinely informing whichever direction this character takes." Kondabolu had a positive reaction to Azaria's comments.

In an interview with USA Today, creator Matt Groening dismissed the criticism of the Apu character, saying, "I think it's a time in our culture where people love to pretend they're offended". Dana Walden, the CEO of 20th Century Fox Television, said in an August 2018 interview in regard to the Apu controversy that the network trusts the showrunners "to handle it in the way that's best for the show". In October 2018, in the South Park episode "The Problem with a Poo", Mr. Hankey is expelled and sent to a land where "people don't care about bigotry and hate" – Springfield. The episode ended with a title card, #cancelthesimpsons, similar to the promo for South Park that called for the cancellation of itself. However, on the DVD commentary South Park creators Trey Parker and Matt Stone stated that the people on The Simpsons are their friends and that joke was not a jab at The Simpsons but at the documentary and that they found it amusing how many misinterpreted the joke as an attack on The Simpsons. Al Jean also tweeted about the episode "It's actually in favor of us saying people are too critical."

In the UK, Hugo Rifkind criticized in The Times what he characterized as the prevalent attitude concerning potentially offensive material: that the possibility that somebody might be offended is enough for material to be considered offensive. He also stated that Apu is portrayed very positively, smarter than every other character except for Lisa, and that the show was much ruder about other characters like Ned Flanders, Krusty and Groundskeeper Willie.

On October 26, Adi Shankar stated in an interview with IndieWire that Apu would be leaving The Simpsons. On October 29, 2018, executive producer Al Jean responded to the speculation and stated that "Adi Shankar is not a producer on the Simpsons. I wish him the best but he does not speak for our show". On August 27, 2019, several sources reported that Groening had confirmed Apu's continued position on the show during the Simpsons panel at Disney's D23 Expo, telling a fan who asked whether or not Apu would remain, "Yes. We love Apu. We're proud of Apu."

Azaria announced on January 17, 2020, that he and the production team agreed to allow him to step away from voicing Apu, "unless there's some way to transition it or something". Azaria had followed the debate over the previous years since Kondabolu's essay and documentary, read up on and attended seminars on racism and social consciousness, and spoken to Indian-American colleagues including fellow actor Utkarsh Ambudkar (who had performed as Apu's nephew in "Much Apu About Something") about the situation. He came to understand the issues around the character of Apu compared to the other stereotypical characters on The Simpsons was the idea of permissible use, which led to his decision to quit voicing Apu. Azaria said, "There hasn't been an outcry over these  characters  because people feel they're represented. They don't take it so personally, nor do they feel oppressed or insulted by it."

In the April 12, 2021 episode of Dax Shepard's podcast Armchair Expert, Azaria apologized for "racism, my participation in racism, or at least in a racist practice or in structural racism, as it relates to showbusiness or...all the above." One reaction to Azaria's apology came from actress/writer Mellini Kantayya, who, in a Washington Post'' opinion piece, wrote that hearing Azaria's concession "and for him to say so not in a carefully crafted PR statement, but in a conversation long after the news cycle had moved on, caught me off guard. Azaria reached his conclusions after years of learning and reflection. He recognized how his work had hurt Indian Americans and wanted to start making amends. That's why I cried. His apology was cold comfort, given my past, but the validation and acknowledgment still mattered."

References

Citations

Bibliography

External links
 Apu Nahasapeemapetilon on IMDb

The Simpsons characters
Animated characters introduced in 1990
Television characters introduced in 1990
Fictional shopkeepers
Fictional Indian-American people
Fictional Hindus
Cultural depictions of Indian men
Fictional people with acquired American citizenship
Fictional computer scientists
Male characters in animated series
Animation controversies in television
Race-related controversies in animation
Race-related controversies in television
Fictional vegan and vegetarian characters
Characters created by Matt Groening
Hinduism in pop culture-related controversies

de:Figuren aus Die Simpsons#Apu Nahasapeemapetilon